Litschauerella is a genus of corticioid fungi in the family Hydnodontaceae. The widely distributed genus contains four species. The genus was described by German mycologist Franz Oberwinkler in 1965. The name commemorates Austrian mycologist Viktor Litschauer (1879–1939).

References

Trechisporales
Trechisporales genera
Taxa described in 1965